Tak Yuet Lau is a village in the Lo Wu area of North District, Hong Kong.

External links

 Delineation of area of existing village Tak Yuet Lau (Ta Kwu Ling) for election of resident representative (2019 to 2022)

Villages in North District, Hong Kong